Willoughton is a village and civil parish in the West Lindsey district of Lincolnshire, England. According to the 2001 Census the village had a population of 330, increasing to 341 at the 2011 census.

The name 'Willoughton' derives from the Old English wilig-tūn meaning 'willow tree farm/settlement'.

The church of St Andrew was built in 1794 to replace earlier buildings on the site, and was restored in 1888. It is of Georgian style. There was a Primitive Methodist chapel, built in 1866, replacing an earlier chapel of 1837. It closed in 1979 and has since been converted into apartments.

Willoughton has a post office and village shop, a primary school, village hall and a public house, the Stirrup.

The folklorist, historian and archaeologist Ethel Rudkin lived in the village for much of her life.

Lincolnshire preceptories
Until their disbandment in 1312, the Knights Templar were major landowners on the higher lands of Lincolnshire, where they had a number of preceptories on property which provided income, while Temple Bruer was an estate on the Lincoln Heath, believed to have been used also for military training. The preceptories from which the Lincolnshire properties were managed were:
Aslackby Preceptory, Kesteven
Bottesford, Lindsey
Eagle, Kesteven
Great Limber, Lindsey
Horkstow, Lindsey
Witham Preceptory, Kesteven
Temple Bruer, Kesteven
Willoughton Preceptory, Lindsey
Byard's Leap was part of the Temple Bruer estate.

References

External links

Villages in Lincolnshire
Civil parishes in Lincolnshire
West Lindsey District